Silent Witnesses (Немые свидетели) is a 1914 Russian film  directed by Yevgeni Bauer about the relationship between masters and servants in pre-revolutionary Russia.

Plot 

When Variusha, a maid in a Russian upper-class household, is not allowed to go and see her children in the country, the porter's granddaughter Nastya agrees to replace her. Soon she attracts the attention of Pavel, the son of the house, who starts flirting with her. When Nastya finds out that Yelena, Pavel's fiancée, has a lover, she tries to chase him away and refuses the money offered to her to remain silent. But Pavel does not want to endanger the wedding arranged for him. He has lost interest in Nastya and treats her only as a maid.

Cast 
 Aleksandr Chargonin as Pavel Kostritsyn
 Aleksandr Kheruvimov as The Porter
 Dora Chitorina as Nastya
 Elsa Krueger as Yelena
 Andrey Gromov

References

External links 
 

1914 films
Articles containing video clips
Russian silent films
Russian black-and-white films
Films of the Russian Empire
1910s Russian-language films